Irazu Costa Rican Restaurant is a Latin American restaurant in Chicago, Illinois that opened in 1990. It is cash only and BYOB.  Irazu is located on the storied Milwaukee Avenue (Chicago) in the Bucktown/Wicker Park neighborhood on Chicago's north side. The name Irazu takes its name from a volcano in Costa Rica.

Menu
The menu is known for its Costa Rican sandwiches, traditional dishes, burritos, and non-alcoholic drinks, especially milkshakes.  Owner Henry Cerdas described it as "Latin soul cuisine-an overlap of Mexican and South American food," and intended to be a casual, non-pretentious atmosphere suitable for kids.

Décor
Anna Maria Barry-Jester of Five Thirty Eight's Life blog described the décor as, "A beautiful outdoor patio strung with lights and murals of volcanic scenes at indoor tables are the superficial draw. A chalkboard next to my table listed the top 10 sites to visit in Costa Rica, and the tables were covered in a particular red plastic that had me wondering if I’d been magically transported to Central America."

National Media Coverage

National Best Burritos
Irazu was one of three Chicago restaurants to make The Daily Meal's top 35 best burritos in America list.

Secret Life of Milkshakes (Food Network)
Irazu was profiled on "The Secret Life of Milkshakes" with Jim O'Connor on Food Network.

Diners, Drive-ins and Dives (Food Network)
Irazu was featured on Diners, Drive-ins and Dives with Guy Fieri visiting and sampling the chicharron with pico de gallo and a pepito sandwich with steak and black beans.

Check Please!
Irazu was featured on the PBS TV food show Check, Please!.

Five Thirty Eight's Burrito Bracket
The popular Five Thirty Eight website of Nate Silver, owned by ESPN, profiled Irazu's burritos in its Burrito Bracket national competition. The blog noted the irony that burritos are not a Costa Rican food. Barry-Jester wrote, "It serves a popular burrito, but that’s not why people go there to eat."

Chuckie Sparkles Special
Chuckie Sparkles awarded Irazu "Best Homestyle Restaurant in the City" every year from 1996 to 2020.

References

External links
 

Latin American restaurants in Chicago
Restaurants established in 1990
Costa Rican cuisine